Duprez may refer to:
Caroline Duprez (1832-1875), French soprano
Gilbert Duprez (1806–1896), French tenor, singing teacher and minor composer
June Duprez (1918–1984), English film actress
Fred Duprez (1884–1938), American film actor and comedian who appeared mainly in British films
Charles H. Duprez (1833–1902), American minstrel show performer and manager
Duprez & Benedict's Minstrels, an American minstrel group led by Charles H. Duprez and Lew Benedict that enjoyed its greatest popularity in the late 1860s and 1870s
Karina Duprez (born 1946), Mexican director and former actress